HMS Hardy was a Royal Navy ship that was one of 20 s. Serving during the First World War, she was part of the Grand Fleet at the Battle of Jutland. Hardy was built by John I. Thornycroft & Company and laid down on 13 November 1911. The ship was launched on 10 October 1912 and completed on 1 September 1913. She was the 6th vessel of the Royal Navy to bear the name Hardy and the third to receive battle honours.

Specifications

The standard build of Acasta-class destroyers' had a displacement of 892 tons at standard load and 1,072 tons at deep load. The ships' dimensions were 267 ft 6in × 27 ft × 10 ft 5in. 
Acasta-class destroyers were armed with three  guns and two torpedo tubes.
Vessels were powered by 2-shaft, oil-fired turbines and had a fuel capacity of 199 tons of oil.

Hardys pennant numbers were H67, H39, and H88.

World War I
During the war Hardy was part of the 4th Destroyer Flotilla, a component of the British Grand Fleet.

On 16 December 1914, HMS Hardy saw action in the Dogger Bank area in the early stages of the German raid on Scarborough, Hartlepool and Whitby. Three crew were killed and ten wounded.

On 31 May – 1 June 1916, Hardy saw action in the Battle of Jutland.

In August 1916 the 4th Destroyer Flotilla, to which Hardy belonged, was removed from fleet work and spent most of the rest of the war in Devonport, where its rosters of destroyer grew in numbers until it reached 50 ships in July, 1918.

Fate
HMS Hardy was sold for breaking on 9 May 1921 to Thos. W. Ward's at Briton Ferry.

References

External links 

 Battle of Jutland Crew Lists Project - HMS Hardy Crew List

 

Acasta-class destroyers
World War I destroyers of the United Kingdom
1912 ships
Ships built by John I. Thornycroft & Company